Elad Gabai (or Gabay, ; born 15 November 1985) is a former Israeli professional footballer who played as a right back.

Early life
Gabai was born in Rishon LeZion, Israel, to a Jewish family.

Club career
Gabai has played club football for Bnei Yehuda Tel Aviv, Hapoel Marmorek, Hapoel Bnei Lod and Hapoel Ironi Kiryat Shmona.

He moved to Maccabi Haifa in June 2013.

He spent time in 2018–19 with Hapoel Petah Tikva.

International career
He made his senior international debut for Israel in 2012.

See also
List of Jewish footballers
List of Jews in sports
List of Israelis

References

1985 births
Living people
Israeli footballers
Israel international footballers
Bnei Yehuda Tel Aviv F.C. players
Hapoel Marmorek F.C. players
Hapoel Bnei Lod F.C. players
Hapoel Ironi Kiryat Shmona F.C. players
Maccabi Haifa F.C. players
Beitar Jerusalem F.C. players
Hapoel Ra'anana A.F.C. players
Hapoel Ashkelon F.C. players
Hapoel Petah Tikva F.C. players
Maccabi Yavne F.C. players
Association football fullbacks
Israeli Premier League players
Liga Leumit players
Footballers from Rishon LeZion
Jewish footballers
Israeli Jews